
Henry J. Oosting (March 12, 1903 – October 30, 1968) was an American ecologist and professor. He was born in Holland, Michigan. Oosting attended Michigan State University, where he received the M.S. degree in 1927, then studied with W.S. Cooper at the University of Minnesota, receiving his Ph.D. in botany in 1931, among other notable Cooper students including Murray Fife Buell, Rexford Daubenmire, Frank Edwin Egler, and Jean Langenheim. In 1932, Oosting began his career at Duke University as ecologist in the Department of Botany.

Oosting continued teaching and research at Duke until his retirement, after which research was his focus until his death in 1968. Among his notable students are W.D. Billings, F. Herbert Bormann, and Wilfred B. Schofield. His influence on his field and the respect in which he was held by colleagues are apparent in several memorials. Duke University established "Henry J. Oosting Fellows," an honor given to Ph.D. candidates, as well as an "Oosting Memorial Lecture." Dr. Chris Field, Director of the Carnegie Department of Global Ecology and Professor of Biology and Earth System Science, delivered the 40th Henry J. Oosting Memorial Lecture in April 2011.

The Henry J. Oosting Natural Area was established in Orange County, North Carolina, in his honor, and is considered to have regional significance.

Career chronology
 1927-1932 	Botany instructor, Michigan State University
 1932-1968 	Botany professor, Duke University
 1955		President of Ecological Society of America
 1967		Received Meritorious Teaching Award, Association of Southeastern Biologists

Selected bibliography

References

External links 
 Resolution of Respect for Henry J. Oosting, by W. Dwight Billings, at Ecological Society of America, retrieved 11/2/2011.
  Henry J. Oosting papers, Rubenstein Rare Book and Manuscript Library, Duke University
 Sprugel, Douglas G. "A 'Pedagogical Genealogy' of American Plant Ecologists." Bulletin of the Ecological Society of America 61 (1980):197-200. Accessed 11/2/2011.

Duke University faculty
Michigan State University alumni
University of Minnesota alumni
American ecologists
1903 births
1968 deaths